Year 463 (CDLXIII) was a common year starting on Tuesday (link will display the full calendar) of the Julian calendar. At the time, it was known as the Year of the Consulship of Basilius and Vivianus (or, less frequently, year 1216 Ab urbe condita). The denomination 463 for this year has been used since the early medieval period, when the Anno Domini calendar era became the prevalent method in Europe for naming years.

Events 
 By place 
 Europe 
 Childeric I, king of the Salian Franks, allies with the Roman general Aegidius. During a battle near Orléans, the Visigoths under King Theodoric II are defeated by the Franks while crossing the Loire River.   
 The Suebi live under a diarchy, and fight a civil war over the kingship in Galicia (Northern Spain).

 Asia 
 The Kibi Clan Rebellion against the Yamato state (Japan) in the Korean Peninsula begins.

Births 
 Houfei Di, emperor of the Liu Song Dynasty (d. 477)

Deaths 
 Frumar, Suevic king of Galicia (approximate date)
 Richimund, Suevic king of Galicia (approximate date)
 Romanus of Condat, hermit and saint (approximate date)

References